Mohammad Abdur Rab, Bir Uttom (1919 – 1975) also known as M A Rab, was the first Chief of Staff of the Bangladesh Army from 10 April 1971 till 6 April 1972.

Early life
Abdur-Rab was born at village of Khagaura under Baniachong of Habiganj in 1919. A lifelong bachelor, he was elected as lawmaker from the Jatiya Sangsad constituency comprising Baniachang and Ajmiriganj thanas.

Death
Abdur-Rab died 14 November 1975 at the Combined Military Hospital, Dhaka at age 56. He had been suffering from ailments including anemia. He was laid to rest at his village of khagaura on the banks of Khowai River in Habiganj.

His younger brother Abdur Rahim said that no pension was paid to any of his family members. Abdur Rab's grave is at the district headquarters of Habiganj. Other than some local freedom fighters, nobody was seen to go visit the site, even on the country's national days.

After independence of Bangladesh
Abdur Rab retired from Bangladesh Army soon after Independence due to poor health, similar to M. A. G Osmani. Rumors were spread that Rab was awarded the gallantry medal which his deputy chief of staff (Army) A. K. Khandker conveniently took. Rab was awarded the Independence Day Award posthumously in 2000.

References

1919 births
1975 deaths
People of the Bangladesh Liberation War
People from Baniachong Upazila
Bangladesh Army generals
1st Jatiya Sangsad members
Mukti Bahini personnel